Scifi is short for science fiction, a genre of speculative fiction, typically dealing with imaginative concepts such as advanced science and technology, spaceflight, time travel, and extraterrestrial life.

Scifi, Sci-fi, SciFi, Sci Fi or Syfy may also refer to:

Film
Sci-Fi (G.I. Joe), character from G.I. Joe: A Real American Hero
Science fiction film, a genre

Music
Sci-Fi (album), a recording by Christian McBride

Television broadcasting
AXN Sci Fi, a European movie channel
MTV3 Scifi, a Finnish TV channel
Sci-Fi Friday Night, a science fiction programming block on Iowa Public Television
Sci Fi Universal (Poland), a TV channel
Syfy (UK and Ireland), a TV channel
Syfy, an American TV channel
Syfy Universal, a family of TV stations
Syfy Universal (France), a TV channel
Syfy Universal (Germany), a TV channel